EMAC Recording Studios is a music and commercial recording facility in London, Ontario, Canada, established in 1979 by Robert Nation and Joe Vaughan.

Building 
EMAC Studios is located at 432 Rectory Street in downtown London, Ontario. The building was originally a Salvation Army church built in the 1900s before it was converted into a recording facility in 1990. The renovation and acoustic design was done by Andy Condon to the specifications set by Robert and Joe.

The original EMAC Recording Studios was first located in downtown London in a building which also housed  CKSL Radio. It was originally designed as an audio/visual facility, and was later renovated in 1985 once EMAC had begun commercial and jingle work. In 2000, EMAC brought on Dan Brodbeck as a new partner.

Studios 
The control room of Studio 1 has a 60-channel Neve V3 Series console, with GML Automation faders. The room incorporates the use of RPG rear wall diffusers to create a certified ‘Reflection Free Zone,’ and was one of the earliest of its kind in Canada.  Studio 2 is a smaller room and is primarily used as an edit suite. It houses a 36-channel Sony MXP3036 console with Sony ADS3000 automation. This space also has a Pro Tools rig for editing purposes, as well as music, dialogue and sound effect production.

Selected discography 
 Dolores O'Riordan – No Baggage & Are You Listening?
 Kittie – Spit & Oracle
 Landon Pigg – LP
 The Salads – Fold A to B & The Big Picture
 Headstrong – Headstrong
 Helix - The Power of Rock and Roll
 Jersey – Generation Genocide
 Holly McNarland – Live at the Great Hall
 Clockwise – Healthy Manipulation
 Nicole Scott – Self Titled
 BURNusBOTH – Stray Bullets
 Luddites – 86-91
 Don Campbell – Freedom
 Cirque du Soleil - Corteo
Producers and Engineers:
 Robert Nation
 Joe Vaughan
 Dan Brodbeck
 GGGarth Richardson
 Jack Richardson
 Moe Berg
Matt Grady

TV & film 
 Pixar's Up
 Michael Moore’s Sicko
 Anne of Green Gables: A New Beginning
 High Point: Casinos of the World
 Taste of Life: A Gourmet Food Travel Show

References

External links
 

Recording studios in Canada
Mass media companies established in 1979
1979 establishments in Ontario